WYGI (1430 AM) is a radio station licensed to Madison, Tennessee. The station serves the Nashville, Tennessee, area along with sister station WHPY-FM.

WYGI, which was WPLN at the time, was an effort by the directors of Nashville Public Radio to find a place to program NPR features at the time such as The Diane Rehm Show and similar fare that had a definite and loyal audience but a lesser one than public radio standbys such as NPR's All Things Considered and Morning Edition and American Public Media's now-defunct A Prairie Home Companion (later known as Live From Here). The more popular programs were heard on WPLN-FM, 90.3 MHz, while some of the alternative programs were aired on the WPLN on the AM band. A few features were aired by both at different times.

The former call sign WPLN originated from Public Library of Nashville, reflecting the original status of public radio in Nashville as a subsidiary of the public library. Although the library and the radio station had developed separate operations and boards of directors well before the addition of the AM station, the FM radio had retained the 'PLN' moniker and it was deemed to be less potentially confusing for the AM station likewise to use it in preference to any other.

History
WPLN began broadcasting on April 1, 2002, as WQDQ, shortly after Nashville Public Radio acquired the station. WQDQ became WPLN on April 9, 2002. Following many years of relative success as pioneering country music station WENO (known in the area for being the first to play the genre during all of the broadcast day, not just at night as the legendary WSM did for many years), 1430 AM had numerous owners and several formats and, shortly before the sale, it had been simulcasting the news programming of local CBS television affiliate WTVF and its affiliated cable outlet. The station was generally considered to be financially marginal, which is why the frequency was available for sale to the local public radio board, due to lack of interest by potential commercial buyers. In general, the AM frequency is part of a trend for radio markets of one million people or more to have multiple public outlets carrying distinct formats. However, with Nashville Public Radio's purchase of Vanderbilt University student station WRVU and converting it to an all-classical format as WFCL, WPLN-FM's format was changed on June 8, 2011, to an all-news-and-talk format similar to WPLN's former schedule; at this point, WPLN began changing over to the format outlined above. WFCL is now WNXP and changed in 2020 to an adult album alternative format, with classical music moving to a WPLN-FM HD signal.

As of March 2020, WPLN was also heard on its sister station WPLN-FM's HD3 channel. From May 2011 until March 2020, it was previously heard on the HD2 subchannel.

In 2020, WPLN converted its format to that of the BBC World Service, broadcasting its programming 24 hours a day, seven days a week. All other programs were dropped.

On September 20, 2022, Nashville Public Radio announced that it was selling WPLN to Kensington Digital Media.

WPLN signed off at noon on December 22, 2022, in preparation for the sale to Kensington Digital Media. It was also noted that Kensington would debut a new format after the New Year in 2023 and change the station's call sign to WYGI. The BBC World Service and the WPLN International format continued to be broadcast on the WPLN-FM HD3 subchannel. The call sign change occurred on January 10, 2023.

See also
 List of Nashville media

References

External links

YGI
Radio stations established in 1957
1957 establishments in Tennessee
Classic hits radio stations in the United States